Top Chef: Colorado is the fifteenth season of the American reality television series Top Chef. The season's details and cast were revealed on October 12, 2017. The show was filmed in various cities across Colorado, including Denver, Boulder, Telluride, and Aspen. The season premiered on December 7, 2017, and concluded on March 8, 2018. Last Chance Kitchen premiered on November 30, 2017. In the season finale, Joseph "Joe" Flamm was declared the winner over runner-up Adrienne Cheatham. Fatima Ali was voted Fan Favorite.

Contestants

Fifteen chefs were selected to compete in Top Chef: Colorado. In addition, four returning competitors from previous seasons competed in the Last Chance Kitchen for the opportunity to enter the main competition: Top Chef: San Francisco contestant Lee Anne Wong, Top Chef: Los Angeles runner-up and All-Stars contestant Marcel Vigneron, Top Chef: California contestant Kwame Onwuachi, and Top Chef: Las Vegas finalist and All-Stars contestant Jennifer Carroll. Following the sixth episode of Last Chance Kitchen, Wong was selected to join the main cast. Claudette Zepeda-Wilkins previously appeared as a contestant on the second season of Top Chef México, the Mexican version of Top Chef from NBC Universo.

New contestants

Carrie Baird and Brother Luck returned for Top Chef: Kentucky, competing in the Last Chance Kitchen. Joe Sasto returned for Top Chef: All-Stars L.A.

Returning contestants

Contestant progress

: The chef(s) did not receive immunity for winning the Quickfire Challenge.
: Laura lost the Sudden Death Quickfire Challenge and was eliminated.
: Following Episode 6 of Last Chance Kitchen, Claudette rejoined the competition, and Lee Anne was introduced as a regular competitor.
: Due to severe altitude sickness and concerns over her unborn baby's health, Lee Anne elected to withdraw from the competition.
: Joe F. lost the Sudden Death Quickfire Challenge and was eliminated.
: Joe F. won Last Chance Kitchen and returned to the competition.
 (WINNER) The chef won the season and was crowned "Top Chef."
 (RUNNER-UP) The chef was the runner-up for the season.
 (WIN) The chef won the Elimination Challenge.
 (HIGH) The chef was selected as one of the top entries in the Elimination Challenge but did not win.
 (IN) The chef was not selected as one of the top or bottom entries in the Elimination Challenge and was safe.
 (LOW) The chef was selected as one of the bottom entries in the Elimination Challenge but was not eliminated.
 (OUT) The chef lost the Elimination Challenge.
 (WDR) The chef voluntarily withdrew from the competition.

Episodes

Last Chance Kitchen

References

Notes

Footnotes

External links

 Official website

Top Chef
2017 American television seasons
2018 American television seasons
Television shows set in Colorado
Television shows filmed in Colorado